This is a list of planned cities (sometimes known as planned communities or new towns) by country. Additions to this list should be cities whose overall form (as opposed to individual neighborhoods or expansions) has been determined in large part in advance on a drawing board, or which were planned to a degree which is unusual for their time and place.

A

Afghanistan

 Darulaman, Kabul

Argentina

 Ciudad Jardín Lomas del Palomar, Buenos Aires
 La Plata, Buenos Aires
 La Punta, San Luis
 Federación, Entre Ríos

Australia

 Adelaide, South Australia
 Canberra, Australian Capital Territory
 Churchill, Victoria
 Eaglemont, Victoria
 Environa, New South Wales – never built
 Garden City, Victoria
 Griffith, New South Wales
 Inala, Queensland
 Springfield, Queensland
 Joondalup, Western Australia
 Karratha, Western Australia
 Leeton, New South Wales
 Melbourne central business district, Victoria
 Mildura, Victoria
 Monarto, South Australia never built
 Multifunction Polis, South Australia never built
 Palmerston, Northern Territory
 Yallourn, Victoria

Austria
 St. Pölten

B

Bangladesh
Dhanmondi Thana
Gulshan Thana
Kawran Bazar
Mirpur Thana
Motijheel
Purbachal New Town  under construction
Uttara Thana

Belarus

 Navapolatsk plan developed in 1958
 Salihorsk construction began in 1958

Belgium
 Charleroi
 Louvain-la-Neuve
 Scherpenheuvel

Belize
 Belmopan

Botswana
 Gaborone

Brazil

 Água Boa, Mato Grosso
 Águas de São Pedro, São Paulo
 Alta Floresta, Mato Grosso
 Apucarana, Paraná
 Aracaju, Sergipe
 Arapongas, Paraná
 Ariquemes, Rondônia
 Belmonte, Santa Catarina
 Belo Horizonte, Minas Gerais  inaugurated in 1897
 Boa Vista, Roraima
 Brasília, Distrito Federal
 Cambé, Paraná
 Cascavel, Paraná
 Cataguases, Minas Gerais  most of the town's central areas were developed according to a plan, though the rest of the town has since grown randomly
 Chapecó, Santa Catarina
 Cianorte, Paraná
 Colíder, Mato Grosso
 Curitiba, Paraná
 Erechim, Rio Grande do Sul
 Fordlândia a dream of Henry Ford, now abandoned
 Goiânia, Goiás
 Governador Valadares, Minas Gerais (1915)
 Ilha Solteira, São Paulo
 Ipatinga, Minas Gerais
 Loanda, Paraná
 Londrina, Paraná
 Lucas do Rio Verde, Mato Grosso
 Maringá, Paraná
 Naviraí, Mato Grosso do Sul
 Nova Andradina, Mato Grosso do Sul
 Nova Londrina, Paraná
 Nova Mutum, Mato Grosso
 Palmas, Tocantins
 Paragominas, Pará
 Paranavaí, Paraná
 Petrópolis, Rio de Janeiro
 Primavera do Leste, Mato Grosso
 Rolândia, Paraná
 Salvador, Bahia
 Sinop, Mato Grosso
 Sorriso, Mato Grosso
 Tangará da Serra, Mato Grosso
 Teresina, Piauí  inaugurated in 1852 from Oeiras
 Toledo, Paraná
 Três Lagoas, Mato Grosso do Sul
 Umuarama, Paraná
 Vilhena, Rondônia

Bulgaria
Dimitrovgrad

C

Canada
It is a misconception that virtually all cities and towns in Western Canada, which were created after the federal Dominion Lands Act of 1870, (the majority of all such cities), were planned. Most of these were, indeed, railway towns, founded after surveying and planning by the powerful railway companies during construction of the Canadian Pacific Railway, Canada's first transcontinental line or the Canadian National Railway, but this initial start generally only provided one or two streets with a few lots set out, from which the cities grew unplanned.

Batawa, Ontario
Bramalea, Ontario now a part of Brampton
Broughton, Nova Scotia failed
Corner Brook, Newfoundland, Newfoundland and Labrador
Deep River, Ontario
Don Mills, Ontario now a part of Toronto
Erin Mills a planned community of Mississauga, Ontario
Fermont, Quebec
Gagnon, Quebec
Grand Falls-Windsor, Newfoundland
Grande Cache, Alberta, 
Guelph, Ontario
Kapuskasing, Ontario
Kitimat, British Columbia
Mount Royal, Quebec
New Westminster, British Columbia designed by Richard Moody of the Royal Engineers to be the capital of the Colony of British Columbia
Oromocto, New Brunswick
Pinawa, Manitoba
Thompson, Manitoba
Townsend, Ontario failed
Tumbler Ridge, British Columbia
Vaughan, Ontario

Chile
El Salvador mining city

China, People's Republic
The forbidden City: Built to house the emperors during Ming dynasty
Tekes County, Ili Kazakh Autonomous Prefecture

Czech Republic

Havířov
Zlín
Most (Most District)
New Town, Prague
Prague Castle, founded at 870

D – F

Denmark
Esbjerg  replacing the Slesvig harbour towns lost by Denmark in the 1864 Second Schleswig War
Fredericia  fortress town
Herning  cultivation of Central Jutland moorland
Nordhavn  District of Copenhagen
Ørestad  District of Copenhagen

Djibouti
Al Noor City twin city to one of the same name in Yemen

Egypt

Modern
6th of October (city) – Giza Governarate.
10th of Ramadan (city) – Sharqia Governarate.
May 15 (city) – Cairo Governarate.
Ain Sokhna – Suez Governarate.
Badr – Cairo Governarate.
Borg El Arab – Alexandria Governarate.
El Shorouk – Cairo Governarate.
Ismailia – Ismailia Governarate.
Madinaty – Cairo governorate.
New Administrative Capital of Egypt – Cairo governorate.
New Akhmim – Sohag Governarate.
New Aswan – Aswan Governarate.
New Asyut – Asyut Governarate.
New Beni Suef – Beni Suef Governarate.
New Borg El Arab – Alexandria Governarate.
New Cairo – Cairo Governarate.
New Damietta – Damietta Governarate.
New Fayum – Fayum Governarate.
New Nubariya – Beheira Governarate.
New Qena – Qena Governarate.
New Salhia – Sharqia Governarate.
New Tiba – Luxor Governarate.
Obour (city) – Qalubyia Governarate.
Port Fuad – Port said Governarate.
Port Tewfik – Suez Governarate
Ras El Bar-Damietta Governarate.
Ras Sedr – South Sinai Governarate.
Sharm El Sheikh – South Sinai Governarate.
Sheikh Zayed – Giza Governarate.

Under Construction
Proposed new capital of Egypt.
New Alamain.
New Ismailia.
El Galala.

Pre Modern
Memphis, Egypt – The city and capital of ancient Egypt. It was built by king Narmer around 3150 B.C.
Akhetaten – A city built by order of the Pharaoh Akhenaten in the 14th century B.C. It was the capital of Egypt in his reign.
Pithom – A city built by order of the Pharaoh Ramesses II in the 13th century B.C.
Pi-Ramesses – Another city built by order of Ramesses II in the 13th century B.C. It was the capital of Egypt in his reign and it was the first city to exceed 100,000 in the history of Egypt. At its peak, the population of the city was 300,000.
Heracleion – A city built in the 12th century B.C. The city had been a major port in ancient Egypt before it subsided below sea level.
Alexandria – A city built by order of Alexander the Great in the 4th century B.C. It was the first city in Egypt to have a population of half million.
Berenice Troglodytica – A city built on the Red Sea coast in the 3rd century B.C. by Ptolemy I.
Fustat – A city built around 7th century CE by order of 'Amr ibn al-'As when he conquered Egypt, to be its capital
al-Askar – the capital of Egypt during the rule of the Tulunide dynasty.
al-Qata'i – Capital of Egypt during the Ikhshid dynasty.
Cairo –  was built in 10th century CE By the Fatimid Caliph Al Muizz.

Estonia

Paldiski
Võru

Finland

 Hamina
 Rovaniemi
 Tapiola, Espoo

France

 Hautepierre, a district within Strasbourg
 La Grande-Motte
 Near Lille:
 Villeneuve d'Ascq
 Near Lyon:
 Isle d'Abeau
 Near Marseille:
 Aigues-Mortes
 Fos-sur-Mer
 Rives de l'Etang de Berre
 Neuf-Brisach, Alsace
 Near Paris:
 Cergy-Pontoise
 Évry
 Marne-la-Vallée
 Saint-Quentin en Yvelines
 Sénart
 Versailles
 Le Vésinet
 Near Rouen:
 Val-de-Reuil
 Royal Saltworks at Arc-et-Senans, Franche-Comté
 Le Touquet

G – H

Germany

 Bremerhaven, Bremen
 Eisenhüttenstadt, Brandenburg
 Espelkamp, North Rhine Westphalia
 Freudenstadt, Baden-Württemberg
 Geretsried, Bavaria
 Glückstadt, Schleswig-Holstein
 Hellerau, Saxony
 Karlsruhe, Baden-Württemberg
 Ludwigslust, Mecklenburg-Vorpommern
 Mannheim, Baden-Württemberg
 Marienberg, Saxony
 Neutraubling, Bavaria
 Putbus, Mecklenburg-Vorpommern
 Salzgitter, Lower Saxony
 Bielefeld-Sennestadt, North Rhine Westphalia
 Traunreut, Bavaria
 Waldkraiburg, Bavaria
 Welthauptstadt Germania a renewal of Berlin; never built
 Wilhelmshaven, Lower Saxony
 Wolfsburg, Lower Saxony

Ghana
Tema

Greece

 Amaliada
 Aspra Spitia
 Aspropyrgos
 Skala town, Oropos

 Ancient Olympia
 Ermoupoli
 Rhodes beyond old town
 Nafplio
 Elefsis
 Rokkos
 Panagiouda
 Patra
 Serres
 Sparta
 Thessaloniki
 Athens-Redesigned in 1834 as the new Greek capital.
 Ioannina
 Kalamata
Lavrio
Nea Peramos
Nea Makri
Nea Moudania
Porto Rafti
Rafina
 Thebes
 Herakleion
 Hania
 Kalamata
 Korinthos
 Nea Fokea, Anavyssos

Hong Kong

 Fanling-Sheung Shui New Town, Fanling Town and Sheung Shui Town
 North East New Territories New Development Area
 North Lantau New Town, Tung Chung
 North West New Territories New Development Area
 Sha Tin New Town, Sha Tin Town and Ma On Shan
 Tai Po New Town, Tai Po Town
 Tin Shui Wai New Town
 Tseung Kwan O New Town
 Tsuen Wan New Town, Tsuen Wan Town and Tsing Yi Town
 Tuen Mun New Town, Tuen Mun Town
 Yuen Long New Town, Yuen Long Town

Hungary

 Dunaújváros, Fejér
 Kazincbarcika, Borsod-Abaúj-Zemplén
 Oroszlány, Komárom-Esztergom
 Petőfibánya, Heves
 Salgótarján, Nógrád
 Tatabánya, Komárom-Esztergom
 Tiszaújváros, Borsod-Abaúj-Zemplén

I

India

 Andhra Pradesh
 Amaravati
 Assam
Bongaigaon
Dibrugarh
Dispur
Tinsukia
 Bihar
Patna capital
Barauni
Bhagalpur
 Chandigarh
 Chandigarh
 Chhattisgarh
 Atal Nagar (Naya Raipur)
 Bhilai
 Delhi
 New Delhi
 Dwarka
 Gujarat
 Gandhinagar
 GIFT City
 Dholera SIR
DREAM City
 Haryana
 Gurgaon
 Panchkula
 Himachal Pradesh
Bilaspur, Himachal Pradesh
Jharkhand
 Bokaro
 Jamshedpur
 Hazaribagh
 Karnataka
 Mysore
 Navanagar
 Kerala
 Kozhikode
 Madhya Pradesh
 Indore
 Maharashtra
 Navi Mumbai (New Mumbai), a satellite city of Mumbai, largest planned city in the world
 Dhule
 Lavasa
 NAINA
 Odisha
 Bhubaneswar
 Rourkela
 Balangir
 Puducherry
 Pondicherry
 Auroville, Pondicherry founded in 1968
 Punjab
 Mohali
 Nangal
 Naya Nangal
 Rajasthan
 Jaipur, planned and founded in 1727 by Maharaja Jai Singh II, ruler of Jaipur State from 1699 to 1744.
 Sri Ganganagar
 Udaipur
 Tamil Nadu
 Chennai, the Old Madras City was built by the British around 18th century.
 Madurai, Tamil Nadu, built around the Meenakshi Temple in 16th century
 
 Trichy, Tamil Nadu, Ucchi Pillayar Temple, Rockfort built around 7 century.
Thanjavur, Brihadisvara Temple was built by Rajaraja Chola in 17th century.
 Srirangam, Ranganathaswamy Temple, Srirangam, world's largest functioning Hindu temple.
Telangana
 Hyderabad, built around 16th century.
 Uttar Pradesh
 Allahabad
 Fatehpur Sikri
 Greater Noida
 Noida
 New Kanpur City
 Uttarakhand
 New Tehri
 West Bengal
 Bidhannagar, Kolkata
 Calcutta Riverside
 Cooch Behar
 Berhampore
 Bardhaman
 Durgapur
 Kharagpur
 New Town, Kolkata
 Kalyani
 Ashoknagar Kalyangarh
 New Jalpaiguri
. Sujalaam Skycity

Indonesia

 Bandung, West Java
 Palangkaraya, Central Kalimantan
 Batam, Riau Islands
 Tanjung Selor, North Kalimantan
 Mamuju, West Sulawesi
 Sofifi, North Maluku
 Maja, Banten

Proposed
 Nusantara

Iran

 Ali Shahr
 Alavicheh
 Andisheh
 Baharestan
 Binalood
 Fuladshahr
 Hashtgerd
 Mohajeran
 Parand
 Pardis
 Ramshar
 Sadra
 Sahand
 Shahin Shahr
 Shahriar, East Azerbaijan
 Golbahar
 Shirin Shahr

 Ancient planned cities
Ardashir-Khwarrah (Gor)

Iraq
Round city of Baghdad

Ireland

Adamstown
Cherrywood (under construction)
Shannon Town, County Clare
Tyrrelstown
Westport

Israel

Acre
Afula
Arad
Ariel
Ashdod
Ashkelon
Beersheba
Bet She'an
Bet Shemesh
Betar Illit
Caesarea
Dimona
Eilat
Hazor HaGelilit
Karmiel
Kiryat Gat
Kiryat Malakhi
Kiryat Shmona
Ma'ale Adummim
Maalot Tarshiha
Mitzpe Ramon
Modi'in
Nahariya
Nazareth Illit
Netivot
Ofakim
Or Akiva
Safed
Sderot
Tiberias
Yeruham

Italy

Abruzzo

 Salle
 San Salvo Marina

Basilicata

 Bosco Salice
 Centro Colonico Villaggio Marconi
 Policoro
 Scanzano Jonico

Calabria

 Sant'Eufemia Lamezia
 Sibari
 Thurio
 Villaggio Frasso
 Villapiana Scalo

Campania

 Borgo Appio
 Borgo Domitio
 Corvinia
 Farinia
 Licola

Emilia Romagna

 Anita
 Milano Marittima
 Tresigallo
 Volania

Friuli Venezia Giulia

 Borgo Brunner
 Fossalon
 Palmanova
 Punta Sdobba
 Torviscosa
 Lignano Sabbiadoro

Lazio

 Acilia
 Aprilia
 Guidonia
 Latina
 Maccarese
 Pomezia
 Pontinia
 Rome
 Sabaudia
 San Cesareo

Lombardia

 Milano 2
 Milano 3

Marche
 Metaurilia

Molise
 Nuova Cliternia

Puglia

 Borgo Cervaro
 Borgo Giardinetto
 Borgo Grappa
 Borgo Mezzanone
 Borgo Perrone
 Borgo Piave
 Cardigliano
 Incoronata
 Marina di Ginosa
 Montegrosso
 Porto Cesareo
 Segezia
 Siponto
 Tavernola

Sardinia

 Arborea
 Campo Giavesu
 Carbonia
 Cortoghiana
 Fertilia
 Linnas
 Pompongias
 Sassu
 Strovina
 Tanca Marchesa
 Torrevecchia
 Tramariglio
 Villaggio Calik

Sicily

 Grammichele

Tuscany

 Alberese
 Albinia
 Calambrone
 Macchiascandona
 Pienza
 Spergolaia
 Tirrenia

Veneto
Candiana

Ivory Coast
Yamoussoukro

J – L

Japan

Planned cities
 Sapporo

All the cities in Hokkaido are planned cities.

 Ōshū, Iwate
 Historic Monuments and Sites of Hiraizumi
 Sendai/Izumi-ku, Sendai
 Tomiya, Miyagi
 Ōgata, Akita
 Tsukuba, Ibaraki
 Saitama City
 Saitama New Urban Center
 Tokyo City   old palace Edo
 Tama, Tokyo
 Kunitachi, Tokyo
 Chiba, Chiba
 Mihama-ku, Chiba
 Kamakura, Kanagawa
 Yokohama
 Minato Mirai 21
 Sagamihara
 Nagoya
 Kōka, Shiga
 Shigaraki Palace
 Kyoto   old palace Heian-kyō
 Nagaoka-kyō
 Kyōtanabe, Kyoto
 Kuni-kyō
 Nara   old palace Heijō-kyō
 Asuka, Yamato/Asuka-kyō
 Tenri, Nara
 Sakurai, Nara
 Kōryō, Nara
 Fujiwara-kyō
 Fukuhara-kyō
 Kibi Plateau city
 Osaka  Naniwa-kyō
 Sakai, Osaka
 Kobe
 Hiroshima
 Fukuoka City
 Seaside Momochi
 Dazaifu, Fukuoka/Dazaifu (government)
 Naha, Okinawa
 Shuri, Okinawa

Planned University Towns, Science Cities
 Tsukuba Science City
 Kashiwanoha
 Harima Science Garden City
 Kitakyushu Science and Research Park
 Miyazaki University Town

New Town
 Near Sapporo
 Sweden Hills
 Eniwa New Town Megumino
 Near Tokyo
 Jōsō New Town
 Tsukuba Express Town
 Musashi Ryoku-en Toshi
 Koshigaya Lake Town
 Kōhoku New Town
 Tama Den-en Toshi
 Keikyu New Town
 Tama New Town
 Chiba New Town
 Makuhari Bay Town
 Yukarigaoka
 Near Nagoya
 Kozoji New Town
 Tōkadai New Town
 Nagaoka New Town
 Near Osaka
 Senri New Town
 Senboku New Town
 International culture park city Saito
Near Hiroshima
 Seifu Shinto

Kazakhstan
Astana
Nurkent

Kenya 
 Konza Technopolis – A project for Kenya's Vision 2030

Lebanon 
 Qanafar City – As a transformation project of Kherbet Qanafar

Lithuania

Visaginas
Elektrėnai

M – N

Malaysia

Bandar Baru Bangi, Selangor
Bandar Tun Razak, Kuala Lumpur
Cyberjaya, Selangor
Iskandar Puteri, Johor part of the Iskandar Malaysia project
Kuala Kubu Bharu, Selangor
Petaling Jaya, Selangor
Putrajaya
Penang
Petra Jaya, Sarawak
Shah Alam, Selangor
Subang Jaya, Selangor

Malta

Valletta
Senglea
SmartCity

Mexico
Most Mexican cities founded during the period of New Spain were planned from the beginning. There are historical maps showing the designs of most cities; however, as time passed and the cities grew, the original planning disappeared.  A number of tourist cities have recently been built, such as Cancun or Puerto Peñasco; the latest city to be planned in Mexico was Delicias. Some of these cities are:

Colombia, Nuevo León
Guadalajara, Jalisco
Mexico City, Federal District
Nuevo Laredo, Tamaulipas
Puebla, Puebla
Veracruz, Veracruz

Recent times

Altavista de Ramos, Jalisco
Cancún, Quintana Roo
Ciudad Bugambilias, Zapopan, Jalisco
Ciudad Sahagún, Hidalgo
Delicias, Chihuahua
Ensenada, Baja California
Hacienda Santa Fe, Tlajomulco de Zúñiga, Jalisco
Puerto Peñasco, Sonora

Monaco

 Fontvieille started 1971 and finished in the early 1980s
 Le Portier a district to be built in the west of Fontvieille

Myanmar
Naypyidaw

Netherlands

Almere
Capelle aan den IJssel
Dronten
Emmeloord
Emmen
Den Helder
Haarlemmermeer
Hellevoetsluis
Lelystad
Nieuwegein
Purmerend
Spijkenisse
Zeewolde
Zoetermeer

New Zealand
Pegasus Town
Turangi
Twizel

Nigeria
Abuja
Banana Island Lagos
Bonny Island
Centenary City- Economic City launched by the Nigerian government.
Eko Atlantic City (EAC) – new private funded smart city
Festac Town Lagos
Greater Port Harcourt
Ikeja Lagos
Lekki Lagos
Victoria Island Lagos

Norway
Nordstern planned by occupying Nazi officials in Norway; never built

O

Oman
Duqm
Al Duqm Planned new special economic city, with area of 2000 km2

P

Pakistan

 Gwadar
 Gwadar Port City
 Islamabad
 Bahria Enclave
 Bahria Town Rawalpindi
 Capital Smart City
 DHA Islamabad
 New Murree near Islamabad
 Karachi
 Bahria Town Karachi 
 Bodha Island City 
 Crescent Bay, Karachi 
 DHA City 
 Lahore
 Bahria Town Lahore
 LDA City
 River Ravifront 
 Nawabshah
 Bahria Town Nawabshah

Palestine
Rawabi construction began in January 2010

Philippines

Baguio
General Santos
Koronadal City
Manila — Planned according to the Laws of the Indies during the Spanish Colonial Period. Towns and parishes surrounding Spanish Manila (Intramuros) grew following the contour of the Pasig River or organically. By the late 19th century, this town and parishes were absorbed to create the modern-day city of Manila planned by American architect Daniel Burnham. However, his plan was never fully realized because of the outbreak of World War II. There are six circumferential roads and ten radial roads in Metro Manila with the City of Manila as its axis (focal center).
New Clark City
Palayan
Quezon City
Samal, Davao del Norte

Poland

Borne Sulinowo former German military base, then Soviet secret city, and, since 1993, Polish town
Elbląg
Gdynia
Łódź
Nowa Huta showpiece of Polish socialist realist-era urban planning; now incorporated into the royal city of Kraków
Tychy Nowe Tychy, New Tychy
Ursynów
Zamość a UNESCO World Heritage Site; the result of the opulently wealthy Polish chancellor Jan Zamoyski's financial empire; modeled on Italian-Renaissance theories of the "ideal city" and built by the architect Bernardo Morando; a perfect example of late 16th-century Renaissance urban-planning ideals

Portugal

Braga 16th-century expansion
Espinho   19th century 
Lisbon reconstruction of downtown after the 1755 Lisbon earthquake. Some other buildings and structures of the city survived or suffered only partial or small degree of damage. 
Nisa medieval town
Porto Covo   18th century
Vila Nova de Santo André   20th century
Vila Real de Santo António   18th century

Q – R

Qatar
Lusail

Romania

Alexandria
Drobeta-Turnu Severin
Turnu Măgurele
Victoria

Russia

Akademgorodok
Anapa
Ekaterinburg
Kizlyar
Korolyov
Kronstadt
Magnitogorsk
Moscow have original round plan
Mozdok
Naberezhnye Chelny
Orenburg
Protvino
Rostov on Don
Saint Petersburg
Toliatti
Zelenograd

S

Saudi Arabia

 Jubail
 King Abdullah Economic City under development; announced in 2005; at 2012, some stages completed; scheduled 2020 completion
 Prince Abdulaziz Bin Mousaed Economic City under development
 Yanbu
 NEOM, under development

Serbia

Bor
Kikinda
Majdanpek
Novi Beograd

Singapore

Towns built in the 1960s
Chai Chee
MacPherson
Queenstown
Tiong Bahru
Toa Payoh

Towns built in the 1970s

Ang Mo Kio
Bedok
Bukit Timah Farrer Road
Clementi
Dover
Geylang East Sims Drive, Jalan Eunos and Haig Road
Hillview
Hougang
Kallang Kallang Basin and St George
Marine Parade
Marsiling
Queenstown Ghim Moh and Holland Village
Teck Whye
Telok Blangah

Cities built in the 1980s

Bedok, Kaki Bukit
Bishan
Bukit Batok
Bukit Panjang
Bukit Timah, Toh Yi
Hougang
Jurong East
Jurong West, including Nanyang
Kallang, McNair
Kembangan
Potong Pasir
Serangoon
Simei
Tampines
Toa Payoh, Upper Aljunied
Ubi
Woodlands

Cities built in the 1990s
Choa Chu Kang
Jurong West (Pioneer)
Sembawang
Sengkang

Cities built in the 2000s
Marina Bay
Punggol

Cities built in the 2010s
Bidadari
Punggol Northshore
Simpang
Tampines North
Tengah

Slovakia

Nová Dubnica
Partizánske
Petržalka
Svit

Slovenia

Nova Gorica
Velenje

South Africa

 Sasolburg, Free State
 Welkom, Free State
 Queenstown, Eastern Cape, Eastern Cape

South Korea

Ansan
Bundang
Changwon
Gwacheon
Sejong City proposed multifunctional administrative city
New Songdo City

Spain

 Badia del Vallès, Barcelona
 La Carolina
 Nuevo Baztán
 Tres Cantos

Sweden

 Falköping, Västergötland
 Gothenburg, Västergötland and Bohuslän
 Hässleholm, Scania
 Jakriborg, Scania
 Karlshamn, Blekinge (naval fortress town)
 Karlskrona, Blekinge (naval fortress town)
 Kiruna, Lapland
 Kristianstad, Scania (fortress town)
 Nässjö, Småland
 Stockholm, Södermanland and Uppland satellite towns
 Farsta
 Skarpnäcksfältet, Södermanland
 Vällingby

Switzerland
La Chaux-de-Fonds

T

Taiwan
Zhongxing New Village, Nantou County
Danhai New Town(Chinese wiki page), New Taipei City
Ciaotou New Town, Kaohsiung City

Turkey
Ankara
Antalya
Atça
Erzincan
Istanbul
Konya
Kayseri
Konya
Miletus

U

Ukraine

Pripyat foundation in 1970; then the Ukrainian Soviet Socialist Republic; abandoned in 1986 due to a nuclear disaster
Slavutych built to replace Pripyat
Mariupol

United Kingdom

This includes all new towns created under the New Towns Act 1946 and successive acts, as well as some communities not designated under this name.

England 

 Newton Aycliffe
 Barrow-in-Furness
 Basildon
 Bracknell
 Chorley
 Corby
 Crawley
 Harlow
 Hatfield
 Hemel Hempstead
 Letchworth Garden City
 Milton Keynes "New City"
 Northampton
 Peterborough (Already a city)
 Peterlee
 Poundbury
 Redditch
 Runcorn
 Skelmersdale
 Stevenage
 Telford
 Warrington
 Washington
 Welwyn Garden City

Northern Ireland

 Antrim
 Ballymena
 Craigavon
 Derry (already a city)

Scotland

 Cumbernauld
 East Kilbride
 Fochabers
 Glenrothes
 Inveraray
 Irvine
 Livingston
 Pulteneytown
 Tornagrain
 Ullapool

Wales

 Cwmbran
 Newtown

United States

New communities built in the Colonial and post-Colonial era

 Annapolis, Maryland
 Augusta, Georgia
 Charleston, South Carolina
 Columbia, South Carolina
 Holyoke, Massachusetts
 Mobile, Alabama
 New Haven, Connecticut the first planned city in America; designed in 1638
 New Orleans, Louisiana
 Philadelphia, Pennsylvania
 Raleigh, North Carolina
 Richmond, Virginia
 Rogersville, Tennessee
 Savannah, Georgia
 Washington, D.C.
 Williamsburg, Virginia
 Wilmington, North Carolina
 Winston-Salem, North Carolina planned by the Moravians; later merged with Winston

New communities built in the 19th century

 Amarillo, Texas
 Austin, Texas
 Back Bay – section of Boston, Massachusetts
 Brownsville, Texas
 Buffalo, New York
 Corpus Christi, Texas
 Dallas, Texas
 DuPont, Washington
 Fort Worth, Texas
 Glendale, Ohio
 Houston, Texas
 Huntington, West Virginia
 Indianapolis, Indiana
 Llewellyn Park, New Jersey
 Manchester, New Hampshire
 Most of the Manhattan borough of New York City, New York – New York City originated in the 1620s without a master plan, but the Commissioners' Plan of 1811 defined the street layout for the borough north of Houston Street.
 Memphis, Tennessee – a grid plan with a public promenade along the Mississippi River and four designated public squares; surveyed in 1819
 Midland, Texas
 Milledgeville, Georgia
 New Plymouth, Idaho
 Parksley, Virginia
 Pullman, Illinois – now part of Chicago
 Riverside, Illinois
 San Antonio, Texas
 Salt Lake City, Utah
 Shreveport, Louisiana
 St. Petersburg, Florida
 Tallahassee, Florida
 Tampa, Florida
 Topeka, Kansas
 Vandergrift, Pennsylvania

New communities built in the early 20th century

 Atascadero, California
 Avondale Estates, Georgia
 Baldwin Hills Village, California
 Cerritos, California
 Chatham Village, Pittsburgh
 Commerce, California
 Coral Gables, Florida
 Dundalk, Maryland
 Fairfield, Alabama
 Highland Park, Texas
 Industry, California
 Kingsport, Tennessee
 Las Vegas, Nevada
 Longview, Washington
 Mariemont, Ohio
 Minden, Nevada
 Mountain Lakes, New Jersey
 Radburn, New Jersey
 Roland Park, Baltimore, Maryland
 Shaker Heights, Ohio
 Sugar Land, Texas
 Sunnyside Gardens, New York
 Twin Falls, Idaho
 Venice, Florida
 The Woodlands, Texas

New communities built with federal aid in the 1930s and for Defense Housing in Early 1940s

 Arthurdale, West Virginia
 Audubon Park, New Jersey
 Boulder City, Nevada
 Greenbelt, Maryland
 Greendale, Wisconsin
 Greenhills, Ohio
 Henderson, Nevada
 Norris, Tennessee
 Roosevelt, New Jersey
 Winfield Township, New Jersey

Secret cities built as part of the Manhattan Project
The Manhattan Project was the successful effort by the U.S. government to develop an atomic bomb during World War II.

 Los Alamos, New Mexico
 Oak Ridge, Tennessee
 Richland, Washington

New communities built privately in the post-World War II era

 Babbitt, Minnesota
 California City, California
 Hoyt Lakes, Minnesota
 Joppatowne, Maryland
 Levittown, New York
 Levittown, Pennsylvania
 Park Forest, Illinois
 Rohnert Park, California
 Sharpstown, Houston, Texas
 Silver Bay, Minnesota
 Willingboro, New Jersey

New communities built in the 1960s and 1970s

 Anaheim Hills, California*
 Arcosanti, Arizona
 Audubon New Community, New York near Buffalo
 Aventura, Florida
 Clear Lake City, Houston, Texas
 Columbia, Maryland
 Cold Spring, Maryland Baltimore
 Coral Springs, Florida
 Coto de Caza, California
 Crofton, Maryland
 First Colony, Sugar Land, Texas see Sugar Land, Texas
 Foster City, California
 Hawaii Kai, Hawaii
 Irvine, California*
 King City, Oregon
 Kingwood, Houston, Texas
 La Vista, Nebraska
 Las Colinas, Irving, Texas
 Laguna Niguel, California
 Mililani, Hawaii*
 Mission Viejo, California
 Palm Coast, Florida
 Peachtree City, Georgia
 Peachtree Corners, Georgia
 Reston, Virginia
 Rio Rancho, New Mexico
 Sugar Creek, Sugar Land, Texas see Sugar Land, Texas
 Sunriver, Oregon
 Valley Ranch, Irving, Texas
 Village of Cross Keys, Maryland see Baltimore, Maryland
 Woodhaven, Fort Worth, Texas

 Anaheim Hills and Irvine, California; and Mililani, Hawaii, began construction in the 1970s, but have not been completed due to their size, and will not be completed for at least ten years.

New communities sponsored by the U.S. Department of Housing and Urban Development after 1970

 Cedar-Riverside, Minnesota Minneapolis, Minnesota
 Flower Mound, Texas near Dallas, Texas
 Gananda, New York near Rochester, New York
 Harbison, South Carolina near Columbia, South Carolina
 Jonathan, Minnesota near Minneapolis
 Maumelle, Arkansas near Little Rock, Arkansas
 Newfields, Ohio Dayton, Ohio
 Park Forest South, Illinois near Chicago, Illinois
 Radisson, New York near Syracuse, New York
 Riverton, New York near Rochester, New York
 Roosevelt Island, New York part of New York City
 Shenandoah, Georgia near Atlanta, Georgia
 Soul City, North Carolina Warren County, North Carolina
 St. Charles, Maryland Charles County, Maryland
 San Antonio Ranch, Texas near San Antonio, Texas
 The Woodlands, Texas near Houston, Texas

New communities built privately in the 1980s and 1990s

 Aliso Viejo, California
 Anthem, Arizona
 Carolina Forest, South Carolina
 Celebration, Florida
 Eagle Mountain, Utah planned for 150,000 population
 Greatwood, Sugar Land, Texas see Sugar Land, Texas
 Kapolei, Hawaii
 Laguna West, California
 New Territory, Sugar Land, Texas see Sugar Land, Texas
 Phillips Ranch, California
 Port Liberte, New Jersey
 Rancho Santa Margarita, California
 Seaside, Florida
 Southern Village, North Carolina
 Summerlin, Nevada in the Las Vegas Valley
 Suncadia, Washington
 Viera, Florida
 Westchase, Florida
 Weston, Florida

New communities built privately in the 21st century
 Ave Maria, Florida
 Bayview-Hunters Point, San Francisco, California
 Lakewood Ranch, Florida
 Nocatee, Florida
 Carlton Landing, Oklahoma

Unbuilt or under construction planned cities
Examples of unbuilt planned cities include Walt Disney's Progress City in Florida and Frank Lloyd Wright's Broadacre City.

The following list is organized by state:

California
 Brisbane Baylands
 Centennial
 Civita
 Mountain House
 Newhall Ranch
 Paradise Valley
 Quay Valley
 River Islands at Lathrop
 Sonoma Mountain Village Rohnert Park
 Sutter Pointe
 Tejon Mountain Village
 Travertine Point
 Treasure Island
 Yokohl Ranch
Arizona (Phoenix metropolitan area)
 Buckeye
 Douglas Ranch
 Paradise Farms
 Tartesso
 Verrado

Florida
 Babcock Ranch
 Destiny
 Nocatee
Other states
 Coyote Springs, Nevada
 Forest Lake, Oregon
 Laurent, South Dakota
 Mesa del Sol, New Mexico
 Minnesota Experimental City, Minnesota
 Paulville, Texas
 Seward's Success, Alaska
 Sterling Ranch, Colorado

V – Z

Venezuela
Ciudad Guayana

Yemen
Al Noor City twin city to one of the same name in Djibouti

Vietnam
Thủ Đức
formerly Thủ Đức District, District 9, Ho Chi Minh City and District 2, Ho Chi Minh City

See also 

 List of urban plans

References

Planned